Ponders End railway station is on the  West Anglia Main Line, serving the district of Ponders End in the London Borough of Enfield, north London. Its three-letter station code is PON and it is in Travelcard zone 5.

The station and all trains serving it are operated by Greater Anglia.

It is near to Lee Valley Leisure Complex.

History
The railway line from Stratford to Broxbourne, and Ponders End station, was opened by the Northern & Eastern Railway on 15 September 1840.

The lines through Ponders End were electrified on 5 May 1969. Prior to the completion of electrification in 1969, passenger services between Cheshunt and London Liverpool Street through Ponders End station were normally operated by Class 125 diesel multiple units (which had been purpose-built for the line in 1958).

Service
There is a half-hourly service to London Liverpool Street via Hackney Downs southbound and to Hertford East northbound. On Sundays the service is also half-hourly in each direction, albeit direct to Stratford southbound and northbound towards Hertford East.

Connections
London Buses route 191 serves the station.

References

External links

Enfield, London
Railway stations in the London Borough of Enfield
Former Great Eastern Railway stations
Railway stations in Great Britain opened in 1840
Greater Anglia franchise railway stations